Zopher Delong House is a historic home located at Glens Falls, Warren County, New York, United States. It was built about 1870 and is a -story, three-bay brick residence with a frame service wing. It has Italianate- and Second Empire–style design elements, including a mansard roof. It features a 2-story central pavilion and bracketed entrance portico. Also on the property is the original carriage house.  It is maintained as a historic house museum known as the Chapman Historical Museum by the Glens Falls-Queensbury Historical Association.

It was added to the National Register of Historic Places in 1984.

See also
 Chapman Historical Museum
 National Register of Historic Places listings in Warren County, New York

References

External links
The Chapman Museum website

Houses on the National Register of Historic Places in New York (state)
Second Empire architecture in New York (state)
Italianate architecture in New York (state)
Houses completed in 1870
Houses in Warren County, New York
National Register of Historic Places in Warren County, New York